Kwun Lung Lau is a public housing estate in Kennedy Town, Hong Kong. It is one of the first public housing developments in Hong Kong, built in 1967 to alleviate a housing crisis in the territory. It is on 20 Lung Wah Street.

It consists of seven buildings, namely Block A - G. The overall shape was that of a snaking dragon, and hence its name which means Watching Dragon Building in Chinese.

Kwun Lung Lau is also famous for a landslide on 23 July 1994 that killed five people and injured three. Leaking water and heavy rain had built up behind a masonry retaining wall, which was too thin, and subsequently collapsed. This disaster caused a major review of slope safety in Hong Kong.

Demographics
According to the 2016 population by-census, Kwun Lung Lau has a population of 6,069. 97% of the population is Chinese. Median monthly domestic household income is HK$ 17,000.

Politics
Kwun Lung Lau is located in Kwun Lung constituency of the Central and Western District Council. It was formerly represented by Fergus Leung Fong-wai, who was elected in the 2019 elections until April 2021.

See also
 Sai Wan Estate
 List of public housing estates in Hong Kong

References

Kennedy Town
Public housing estates in Hong Kong